Bruce L. Christensen (April 26, 1943 – November 18, 2022) was an American television executive. He was the president of KSL-TV and Senior Vice President of Bonneville International Corporation. He used to be president and CEO of the Public Broadcasting Service (PBS).

Christensen received his BA from the University of Utah and his MS in Journalism from the Medill School of Journalism at Northwestern University. Christensen began his career as a reporter working for KSL in 1965.  Christensen later worked for BYU University relations and then as general manager of the University of Utah's KUED-TV and KUER-FM.

Christensen moved to Washington, D.C. to serve as president of the National Association of Public Television Stations and then became CEO of PBS. Christensen served at PBS for nine years.

After serving as CEO of PBS, Christensen served from 1993 to 2005 as the dean of the BYU College of Fine Arts and Communications (Brigham Young University).

Christensen was one of the original members of the board of Overseers for the Wheatley Institution at BYU.

Christensen was married to Barbara Lucille Decker. He was a Latter-day Saint and succeeded John S. Tanner as president of the BYU 4th Stake, serving from 1997 to 2002. Christensen died on November 18, 2022, at the age of 79.

References

Sources
bio from listing of Wheatley Institution board of Overseers
Medill Hall of Achievement bio
resolution thanking Christensen for his work with PBS
"New stake presidencies", Church News, May 10, 1997
"Dietician named to top post", Church News, Aug 6, 1994

1943 births
2022 deaths
American male journalists
American leaders of the Church of Jesus Christ of Latter-day Saints
American media executives
Bonneville International
Brigham Young University faculty
American chief executives in the media industry
Medill School of Journalism alumni
University of Utah alumni
PBS people
Latter Day Saints from Utah
Latter Day Saints from Illinois
Latter Day Saints from Washington, D.C.